Yes is the tenth studio album by English synth-pop duo Pet Shop Boys, released on 18 March 2009 by Parlophone. The album was recorded throughout 2008 and was produced by Brian Higgins and his production team Xenomania. Xenomania also co-wrote three of the tracks. Guitarist Johnny Marr and string arranger Owen Pallett appear as well. "Love Etc." was released on 16 March 2009 as the album's lead single.

Background and release
Yes debuted at number four on the UK Albums Chart with first-week sales of 27,639 copies, the duo's highest-placing album since Bilingual (1996). Early sales figures predicted that the album would enter at number one, but its release was beset by distribution problems and Yes proved unable to hold onto its midweek position. The download version erroneously went on sale through the iTunes Store three days before its official release date, rendering 2,500 sales ineligible for the chart, while, the following week, a number of suppliers of the physical album reported stock level problems.

The closing track "Legacy" was subject to censorship in China for political sensitivity reasons, as it contains the lyric "governments fall". The song was changed to an instrumental.

The album was released in multiple formats, including a digital version that included a 48-minute track-by-track commentary on the album, and an 11-disc vinyl version limited to 300 copies, with each disc containing a different album track on the first side and a corresponding instrumental version on the second. The double CD edition of the album incorporated a bonus disc titled Etc., which featured mostly instrumental dub mixes of six album tracks, as well as a new song called "This Used to Be the Future", which features guest vocals by Philip Oakey of the Human League. A standard, single-disc vinyl LP was also issued, but did not coincide with the international CD and download release.

Yes spawned three further singles. On 1 June 2009, "Did You See Me Coming?" was released worldwide on a number of physical and digital formats, backed with three new B-sides. A limited German-only "Beautiful People" CD and download followed in October. The five-track Christmas, Pet Shop Boys' first EP release, was released on 14 December 2009, with "All Over the World" acting as the principal radio promo and gaining a music video.

The album was nominated for Best Electronic/Dance Album at the 2010 Grammy Awards.

Yes was supported by a comprehensive world tour that stretched across 2009–2012. A recording of the tour made in London in December 2009 was released in a CD/DVD package on 15 February 2010 as Pandemonium.

Yes was re-released on 20 October 2017 (along with Elysium) as Yes/Further Listening 2008-2010. This reissue was digitally remastered and contained two bonus discs of B-sides, demos, remixes and rarities from the era.

Artwork
The album sleeve was designed by Mark Farrow and Pet Shop Boys. The tick on the cover consists of 11 coloured squares, each one representing a track. It was inspired by German artist Gerhard Richter (who is referenced in the album's opening track, "Love Etc."), specifically his 4900 exhibition at the Serpentine Gallery and the stained glass window in Cologne Cathedral.

The album's cover was nominated in the 2010 Brit Insurance Design Awards shortlist in the Graphics category.

Track listing

Personnel
Credits adapted from the liner notes of Yes.

Pet Shop Boys
 Neil Tennant – lead vocals ; keyboards, programming 
 Chris Lowe – keyboards, programming 

Additional musicians

 Tim Powell – keyboards, programming ; backing vocals 
 Fred Falke – keyboards, programming 
 Matt Gray – keyboards, programming 
 Brian Higgins – keyboards, programming ; backing vocals 
 Owen Parker – keyboards, programming ; guitar ; backing vocals 
 Sacha Collisson – keyboards, programming ; guitar 
 Xenomania – backing vocals 
 Andy Brown – brass arrangement, brass conducting ; London Metropolitan Orchestra conducting 
 London Metropolitan Orchestra – brass 
 Pete Gleadall – keyboards, programming 
 Kieran Jones – keyboards, programming ; guitar 
 Nick Coler – keyboards, programming ; guitar 
 Jason Resch – keyboards, programming ; guitar 
 Johnny Marr – guitar ; harmonica 
 Carla Marie Williams – backing vocals ; guest vocals 
 Jessie Malakouti – backing vocals 
 Alex Gardner – backing vocals 
 Owen Pallett – orchestral arrangement 
 Cathy Thompson – London Metropolitan Orchestra leader 
 Miranda Cooper – backing vocals 
 Mike Kearsey – brass 
 Steve Hamilton – brass 
 Mark Parnell – drums 
 Toby Scott – keyboards, programming 

Technical
 Brian Higgins – production
 Xenomania – production
 Jeremy Wheatley – mixing
 Andy Dudman – London Metropolitan Orchestra recording 
 Dick Beetham – mastering

Artwork
 Farrow – design, art direction
 Pet Shop Boys – design, art direction
 Alasdair McLellan – photography

Etc. bonus disc
Credits adapted from the liner notes of the special edition of Yes.

Pet Shop Boys
 Neil Tennant – lead vocals ; keyboards, programming 
 Chris Lowe – keyboards, programming 

Additional musicians
 Philip Oakey – guest vocals 
 Pete Gleadall – keyboards, programming 
 Tim Powell – keyboards, programming 

Technical
 Brian Higgins – production 
 Xenomania – production 
 Jeremy Wheatley – mixing 
 Pet Shop Boys – remix 
 Xenomania – remix

Charts

Weekly charts

Year-end charts

Certifications and sales

Release history

References

2009 albums
Albums produced by Xenomania
Parlophone albums
Pet Shop Boys albums